The Westgaard Bridge, also known as Souris River Bridge, near Voltaire, North Dakota is a Pratt pony truss through structure that was built in 1902 to cross the Souris River.  It was listed on the National Register of Historic Places in 1997.

It is the oldest documented bridge in McHenry County.

See also 
Eastwood Park Bridge: NRHP-listed Souris River crossing in Minot, North Dakota
Elliott Bridge: NRHP-listed Souris River crossing also in McHenry County, North Dakota

References

Road bridges on the National Register of Historic Places in North Dakota
Bridges completed in 1902
National Register of Historic Places in McHenry County, North Dakota
Pratt truss bridges in the United States
Metal bridges in the United States
Souris River
1902 establishments in North Dakota
Transportation in McHenry County, North Dakota